The Surface Hub 2S is the second generation of the interactive whiteboard developed and marketed by Microsoft, as part of the Microsoft Surface family. Like the first-generation Surface Hub, the Hub 2S can be wall-mounted or roller-stand-mounted.

Features

Hardware 
Surface Hub 2S uses the 8th-generation Intel Core i5 processor and runs the 64-bit version of Windows 10. The device supports 3840 × 2560 4K resolution and contains an Intel UHD Graphics 620 controller integrated in the CPU.

Unlike the first-generation Surface Hub models, the Hub 2S comes with a new Surface Hub 2 Camera separate from the device which can be plugged into any USB-C port on the side of the device. The camera produces video at 2160p (4K) resolution at 30 fps with anti-flicker and face based auto exposure.

Software 
The Surface Hub runs Windows 10 Team with both Skype for Business and Microsoft Teams for Surface Hub preinstalled. The Hub's welcome screen has three buttons – Call (Microsoft Teams), Whiteboard (Microsoft Whiteboard) and Connect (Miracast).

Configurations

Timeline of Surface family

References

Microsoft
Microsoft Surface
Touchscreens